The 2015 South Derbyshire District Council election took place on 7 May 2015 to elect members of South Derbyshire District Council in England. This was the same day as other local elections.

Election result
After the election, the composition of the council was:
Conservative 24
Labour 12

Ward by ward

Ward results

References

2015 English local elections
May 2015 events in the United Kingdom
2015
2010s in Derbyshire